Colón is a municipality in the La Libertad department of El Salvador.

Colón is surrounded by the municipalities of Santa Tecla, Quezaltepeque, San Juan Opico, Ciudad Arce, and Sacacoyo y Talnique. The municipality was previously known as El Guarumal, and was made a town on 20 August 1886, and a village (villa) on 24 July 1986.

Cantons
The municipality is bordered by various cantons:
Botoncillal
Cobanal
Cuyagualo
El Capulín
El Limón
El Manguito
Entre Ríos
Hacienda Nueva
Las Angosturas
Las Brisas
Las Moras
Lourdes

Tourism
Colón has Los Chorros (a bathing resort) which was destroyed in the 2001 earthquake, but reopened in March 2008.

Security
The city was considered to be one of the most dangerous in the country, reporting various homicides and notorious activity of gangs, locally called ''maras’.

Gallery

Municipalities of the La Libertad Department (El Salvador)